Friday is the debut album by the Danish pop singer and Popstars participant Christine Milton, released on 8 April 2004. It spawned four singles, with "Superstar" being the most successful, peaking at No. 1 on the Danish Singles Chart in February 2003. It was later covered internationally by Jamelia.

Track listing

External links 
 

2004 debut albums
Albums produced by Ghost (production team)
Christine Milton albums